Clark Alexander Hamilton (February 26, 1899 –  April 22, 1980) was an American politician from Malad City, Idaho. He was the Democratic Party  nominee for Governor of Idaho in 1954. Hamilton was defeated by Republican Attorney General Robert E. Smylie.

Hamilton was a member of the Idaho Legislature, serving in the Idaho Senate from 1949 to 1954.

He died in Malheur County, Oregon, in 1980, age 81.

References 

1899 births
1980 deaths
Democratic Party Idaho state senators
People from Malad City, Idaho
20th-century American politicians